is a private junior college in Sayama, Saitama, Japan.

History
It was chartered as a college in 1981.

Courses Offered
 Pedagogy

See also 
 Musashino Gakuin University
 List of junior colleges in Japan

References

External links 
  

Educational institutions established in 1981
Japanese junior colleges
1981 establishments in Japan
Universities and colleges in Saitama Prefecture
Private universities and colleges in Japan